The following is the discography of  Little Brother.

Studio albums

Mixtapes

Singles
from The Listening 
"Whatever You Say" b/w "Light It Up" (2002)
"The Way You Do It" b/w "The Getup" (2003)
from Sleepers 
"Strongest Man" (2005)
"Just Friends" b/w "Scars" (2005)
from The Chitlin Circuit 1.5
"Nobody Like Me" b/w "Welcome To Durham" (2005)
from The Minstrel Show
"Lovin' It" b/w "Hold On (Tellin' Me)" (2005)
"Slow It Down" b/w "Say It Again" (2006)
from Getback
"Good Clothes" (2007)
from Leftback
"Curtain Call" (2010)

Live Albums

Members

Phonte Albums
2003: Phonte & Eccentric: The Story of US
2004: The Foreign Exchange: Connected
2008: The Foreign Exchange: Leave It All Behind
2008: Phonte & Zo!: Zo! & Tigallo Love The 80's
2010: The Foreign Exchange: Authenticity
2011: Charity Starts At Home
2018: No News Is Good News

Rapper Big Pooh Albums
2005: Sleepers
2009: The Delightful Bars
2011: Fat Boy Fresh Vol. 1: For Members Only
2011: Dirty Pretty Things
2012: Fat Boy Fresh Vol.2
2012: Sleepers: Narcoleptic Outtakes (EP)
2013: Fat Boy Fresh Vol.3
2013: Fat Boy Fresh Vol.3.5

9th Wonder Albums
 2004: 9th Wonder & Murs: Murs 3:16: The 9th Edition
 2005: Dream Merchant Vol. 1
 2005: 9th Wonder & Buckshot: Chemistry
 2005: 9th Wonder & Kaze: Spirit Of '94: Version 9.0
 2006: 9th Wonder & Murs: Murray's Revenge
 2006: 9th Wonder & Skyzoo: Cloud 9: The Three Day High
 2007: Dream Merchant Vol. 2
 2008: 9th Wonder & Buckshot: The Formula
 2008: 9th Wonder & Jean Grae: Jeanius
 2008: 9th Wonder & Murs: Sweet Lord
 2011: The Wonder Years
 2018: 9th Wonder Presents: Jamla Is the Squad II

Album Appearances

2005: 9th Wonder & Buckshot - Chemistry - "Birdz (Fly The Coup)" (w/ Keisha Shontelle) 1 & "U Wonderin'" (w/ Sean Price) 2
2005: 9th Wonder - Dream Merchant Vol. 1 - "Speed", "Mr. Dream Merchant" 2 & "Almost Geunine" (w/ Defcon) 1
2005:  Kev Brown - I Do What I Do - "Beats n Rhymes" 1
2005:  The Perceptionists - Black Dialogue - "5 O'Clock" 1
2005:  The Away Team - National Anthem - "Band Practice" 1
2006: Hall of Justus - Hall of Justus: Soldiers of Fortune - "Back At It" (w/ Cormega) 1
2006:  DJ Spinna - Intergalactic Soul - "Make it Hot" 1
2006: DJ Shadow - The Outsider - "Backstage Girl" 1
2007: 9th Wonder - The Dream Merchant Vol. 2 - "No Time To Play" & "What Makes a Man" (w/ Buddy Klein) 2
2007: Cormega - Who Am I? - "The Rap Game" 1
2007: DJ Jazzy Jeff - The Return of the Magnificent EP - "Whatever You Want"
2007: Playaz Circle - Supply & Demand - "Paper Chasin'" 1
2007:  Cunninglynguists - Dirty Acres - "Yellow Lines" 1
2007:  Kev Brown - Exclusive Joints - "United Soul" 1
2008: eMC - The Show - "Traffic"
2008: Kidz in the Hall - The In Crowd - "Paper Trail" 1
2008: Pete Rock - NY's Finest - "Bring Y'all Back" (w/ Joe Scudda)
2008: Akrobatik - Absolute Value - "Be Prepared"
2008: Statik Selektah - Stick 2 the Script - "On The Marquee"
2008:  Jean Grae - Jeanius - "The Time is Now" 1
2010: The Roots - How I Got Over - "Now or Never" & "The Day" 1
2010:  Slum Village - Villa Manifesto - Where Do We Go from Here
2010:  Strong Arm Steady - In Search of Stoney Jackson - "Best of Times" 1
2010:  Yazarah - The Ballad of Purple St. James - "Cry Over You" 1
2011:  9th Wonder - The Wonder Years - "Band Practice" 1
2011:  9th Wonder - The Wonder Years - "One Nights" 1
2012:  Brother Ali - The Bite Marked Heart - "I'll Be Around" 1
2022:  Phife Dawg - Forever - "2 Live Forever" (w/ Posdnuos & Darien Brockington)

1 (Phonte only)
2 (Rapper Big Pooh only)

References 

Hip hop discographies
Discographies of American artists